Giles Foster has been an English television director since 1975, specialising in television dramas. He has also directed in Australia and in Germany (2012-2014). He wrote some television dramas in the 1970s.

He is from Bath, Somerset and was educated at Monkton Combe School.

TV directed
Foster was nominated three times for BAFTA awards for Silas Marner (1985), Talking Heads (A Lady of Letters) (1987), and won Best Single Drama for his film Hotel du Lac (1986).
He also directed the television series Four Seasons (2008) which was rewritten to be set in his home town of Bath.

Selected filmography
The Aerodrome (1983) — based on a novel by Rex Warner
Dutch Girls (1985)
Silas Marner (1985) — based on Silas Marner by George Eliot
Hotel du Lac (1986) — based on Hotel du Lac by Anita Brookner
Northanger Abbey (1987) — based on Northanger Abbey by Jane Austen
Consuming Passions (1988) — based on Secrets by Michael Palin and Terry Jones
Tree of Hands (1989) — based on The Tree of Hands by Ruth Rendell
Monster Maker (1989) — based on a novel by Nicholas Fisk
The Lilac Bus (1990) — based on The Lilac Bus by Maeve Binchy
The Rector's Wife (1994) — based on a novel by Joanna Trollope
Oliver's Travels (1995) — based on a novel by Alan Plater
Coming Home (1998) — based on a novel by Rosamunde Pilcher
Relative Strangers (1999)
The Prince and the Pauper (2000) — based on The Prince and the Pauper by Mark Twain
Bertie and Elizabeth (2002)
Summer Solstice (2005) — based on a story by Rosamunde Pilcher
Starting Over (2007) — based on a novel by Robin Pilcher
Four Seasons (2008) — based on a story by Rosamunde Pilcher
Rosamunde Pilcher's Shades of Love (2010) — based on a story by Rosamunde Pilcher
The Other Wife (2012) — based on a story by Rosamunde Pilcher
Unknown Heart (2014) — based on a story by Rosamunde Pilcher

References

External links

British television directors
British television writers
People educated at Monkton Combe School

Living people
Year of birth missing (living people)